Toi may refer to the following notable people:
Đặng Văn Tới (born 1999), Vietnamese footballer
Deo Nang Toï (1914–2008), Vietnamese royalty
Jūgatsu Toi (1948–2013), Japanese travel writer and visual producer
Mutsuo Toi (1917-1938), perpetrator of the Tsuyama massacre
Roman Toi (1916–2018), Estonian-Canadian composer, choir conductor, and organist
Zang Toi (born 1961), Malaysian designer